This is a list of the characters featured in the American medical drama Body of Proof created by Christopher Murphey starring Dana Delany.

Regular characters

Megan Hunt 
Played by: Dana Delany
Seasons 1–3
Megan Hunt is a brilliant neurosurgeon until a life-changing car accident prevents her from continuing to work in the operating room. Due to minor nerve damage sustained in the car accident, she can no longer use her hands to perform the fine manipulation which is required for the successful practice of surgery. The car crash exposes weaknesses in her family life as well, since her relations with her husband and child had taken a "backseat to her ambition", according to Time Magazine, and she has to work hard to get her personal life in order. Her relationship with her daughter, Lacey, is distant and difficult, but through the seasons, Lacey and Megan's relationship vastly improves. Megan is a very eloquent woman, appearing to be highly independent and insensitive to some degree, but gradually, particularly throughout season 1, she manages to gain more sensitivity and dependence on her colleagues. Coincidentally, the real-life Delany had an experience similar to her character. Two weeks before filming the pilot episode, Delany's car was hit by a bus in Santa Monica; she broke two fingers of her hand, and her car was destroyed. Delany said in an interview that she loves to play "complicated characters" and her character in Body of Proof is "complicated, smart, and definitely complex."

Kate Murphy 
Played by: Jeri Ryan
Seasons 1–3
Chief Medical Examiner, forensic anthropologist and Megan's superior. She is the first female Chief Medical Examiner in Philadelphia's history.  She and Megan are often at odds in the workplace, and now in their personal lives, as Kate briefly dated Megan's ex-husband, Todd Fleming. In season three, she is encouraged to pursue public office by District Attorney Dan Russell. In the series finale, it is still unclear whether Kate will go into politics, though while reconstructing the face of a disfigured murder victim, she admits to Curtis that she really misses the nuts-and-bolts of forensics work.

Peter Dunlop 
Played by: Nicholas Bishop
Seasons 1–2
Former police officer and now Medicolegal Investigator. After a gunshot ripped through his shoulder while he was notifying a family about murder, Peter found himself off the streets and inside a rehab facility.  As partner and confidant to Dr. Megan Hunt, Peter now finds himself investigating Philadelphia's most mysterious medical cases alongside one of the most brilliant Medical Examiners in the country. Peter was stabbed in the episode "Mind Games" and died in Megan's arms.

Bud Morris 
Played by: John Carroll Lynch
Seasons 1–2
Homicide detective. A hardheaded, straight-shooting veteran of the Philadelphia Homicide Division. He fights for justice on the streets of Philly while fighting a personal battle at home: mending a crumbling relationship with his wife who just kicked him out of their Center City Brownstone. The couple began to reconcile after she announced she was pregnant. Bud clashes with Megan several times over their differing views at crime scenes. After seeing a grief counselor for support following Peter's death, he left the force to stay home and raise his newborn baby.

Samantha Baker 
Played by: Sonja Sohn
Seasons 1–2
Homicide detective. Partner of Bud Morris, full of energy and very smart. Unlike Morris, she is more friendly towards Megan and respects her for her straightforwardness and work. After seeing a grief counselor for support following Peter's death, she left the Philadelphia Police Force to move to Virginia to join the FBI.

Ethan Gross 
Played by: Geoffrey Arend
Seasons 1–3
Forensic Pathology Fellow. Ethan now finds himself as the youngest and most enthusiastic fellow working at the Medical Examiner's Office. Ethan partially assumes the position of Megan's Medicolegal Investigator following Peter's death.

Curtis Brumfield 
Played by: Windell Middlebrooks
Season 1–3
Deputy Chief Medical Examiner. Curtis is a capable and intelligent Medical Examiner whose bluster belies his love for his job. Though he is Megan's superior, her full-speed-ahead attitude often allows Megan to convince Curtis to do her bidding.

Lacey Fleming 
Played by: Mary Mouser
Recurring Season 1; main cast Season 2–3
Daughter of Megan and Todd, only grandchild of Joan Hunt. Lacey lives with her father in the first Season. In the second season, Megan and her ex-husband Todd share joint-custody of Lacey, so she moves back and forth between both homes. Late in the second season she is diagnosed with type 1 diabetes.

Tommy Sullivan 
Played by: Mark Valley
Season 3
A former NYPD detective who left under mysterious circumstances, now working in the Philadelphia Homicide division. Tommy had a one-time romantic relationship with Megan that pre-dated the series. Megan alludes to their relationship being some 20 years ago.

Adam Lucas 
Played by: Elyes Gabel
Season 3
A detective in the Philadelphia Homicide division and Tommy's new partner.

Recurring characters

Todd Fleming 
Played by: Jeffrey Nordling
Recurring Seasons 1–2
Todd is a lawyer, Megan's ex-husband and the father of Lacey. He briefly dated Kate.

Joan Hunt 
Played by: Joanna Cassidy
Recurring Seasons 1–3
Joan Hunt is the overbearing mother of Megan and grandmother of Lacey Fleming. She was a judge, but lost re-election for her seat in Season 2. Her husband and father of Megan was thought to have committed suicide when Megan was 13 years old, but it was later revealed that he was murdered and he was forced to make it look like a suicide. After the death of her husband was proved to be a murder, her tough relationship with Megan finally changed for the better. Joan and Lacey get along fine; Lacey being Joan’s only grandchild. However, how well Joan gets along with Todd Fleming, her ex-son-in-law is never shown.

Derek Ames 
Played by:  Cliff Curtis
Recurring Season 2
Derek Ames is an FBI agent who has worked with Megan on a couple of cases and is a potential love interest for her.

Dani Alvarez 
Played by: Nathalie Kelley
Recurring Season 2
Dani is a driver who recovers bodies from crime/accident scenes and delivers them to the M.E.'s office. She is also a love interest of Peter, much to the chagrin of Ethan, who has a crush on her. She dies in episode 18 of season 2.

Aiden Welles
 Played by: Jamie Bamber
Season 2
Aidan is a potential love interest for Megan in season 2.

Charlie Stafford
 Played by: Luke Perry
 Guest Season 2, Recurring Season 3
Dr. Charlie Stafford first appears in the Season 2 two-part episode "Going Viral", as a CDC officer acting as a liaison to the Philadelphia ME's office. In Season 3, he has been promoted to Health Commissioner, and appears in several episodes.

Angela Martin
 Played by: Lorraine Toussaint
 Recurring Season 3
Angela Martin is the chief of the Philadelphia PD, making her first appearance in the Season 3 episode, "Doubting Tommy," and returning later in the season in the episodes, "Disappearing Act" and "Dark City." Chief Martin turned heel in the series finale, "Daddy Issues," as she revealed to Megan that she killed David Hunt (Megan's father) to cover up another murder she committed in 1977. Just as she was about to kill Megan, Chief Martin ended up shot to death by Trent Marsh.

References

External links 

Lists of American comedy-drama television series characters
Characters